Bloshnoy is a rural locality (a khutor) in Tabun-Aralsky Selsoviet of Yenotayevsky District, Astrakhan Oblast, Russia. The population was 3 as of 2010.

Geography 
It is located 34 km south-east from Yenotayevka.

References 

Rural localities in Yenotayevsky District